Helen K. Rosenthal (born October 24, 1960) was formerly an American politician who served as a member of the New York City Council for the 6th district. The district includes the Upper West Side of Manhattan.

Early life and education
Rosenthal was born in Detroit, Michigan, and received a B.A. in socio-economic policy and political theory from Michigan State University in 1982. She earned a Masters in Public Health from Yale University in 1987.

Career 
From 1988 to 1995, Rosenthal served as an Assistant Director of the New York City Mayor's Office of Management and Budget, where she managed the city's healthcare budget under Mayors Ed Koch, David Dinkins, and Rudy Giuliani.

Rosenthal is a longtime member of Community Board 7, having served as Strategy and Budget Committee Chair, Vice Chair, and eventually board chair from 2007 to 2009. During this time, she advocated for additional public school seats on the Upper West Side, using data collection to dispute the city's assertion that the district had 1,500 empty school seats. This resulted in the creation of P.S. 452 in 2010.

New York City Council
In March 2012, Rosenthal announced her candidacy for District 6 of the New York City Council, whose incumbent, Gale Brewer, was term-limited out of office. Rosenthal focused her campaign on issues including public school education, affordable housing, budget expertise, and mass transit improvements. Her bid was endorsed by organizations including the Sierra Club, the National Organization for Women-NYC, and TenantsPAC, a group which advocates for rent-regulated tenants. Other supporters included Gloria Steinem, Michael Moore, former City Councilwoman Ronnie Eldridge, State Senator Liz Krueger, and State Assemblywoman Deborah Glick.

In September 2013, Rosenthal won the Democratic nomination for the District 6 City Council seat, defeating six other candidates. She went on to win the November general election with 78% of the vote, and her vote total was the highest of any candidate running for City Council throughout New York City.

Pedestrian safety emerged as a key issue for Rosenthal when three pedestrians were struck and killed on the Upper West Side over a ten-day period in January 2014. She also advocates for better transportation services meeting the needs of all New Yorkers.

In 2017, Rosenthal won the Democratic primary to become the Democratic nominee, with 65% of the vote over closest competitor Mel Wymore with 31%. Rosenthal defeated Republican Candidate Hyman Drusin and Independent Candidate William Raudenbush in the general election on November 7, 2017. Rosenthal's support of a controversial school desegregation plan in her district was cited in endorsements received from The New York Times, the New York Daily News, and the Amsterdam News.

Rosenthal was ranked first (tied with Keith Powers) as top lawmaker on New York City Council.

In January 2019, Rosenthal announced her candidacy for New York City Comptroller in the 2021 New York City Comptroller election, but she dropped out of the race in July 2020.

Election history

References

External links
 Official website
 New York City Council page

1960 births
New York City Council members
American community activists
Living people
Yale School of Public Health alumni
Michigan State University alumni
Women New York City Council members
21st-century American politicians
21st-century American women politicians
New York (state) Democrats